This is a list of films produced in mainland China ordered by year of release in the 1970s. For an alphabetical listing of Chinese films see :Category:Chinese films

1970

1971

1972

1973

1974

1975

1976

1977

1978

1979

Mainland Chinese Film Production Totals

See also
Cinema of China
Best 100 Chinese Motion Pictures as chosen by the 24th Hong Kong Film Awards

References

Sources
中国影片大典 Encyclopaedia of Chinese Films. 1949.10-1976, 故事片·戏曲片. (2001). Zhong guo ying pian da dian: 1949.10-1976. Beijing: 中国电影出版社 China Movie Publishing House. 
中国影片大典 Encyclopaedia of Chinese Films. 1977-1994, 故事片·戏曲片. (1995). Zhong guo ying pian da dian: 1977-1994. Beijing: 中国电影出版社 China Movie Publishing House. 
中国艺术影片编目 China Art Film Catalog (1949-1979). (1981) Zhongguo Yi Shu Ying Pian Bian Mu (1949-1979). Beijing: 文化艺术出版社 Culture and Arts Press.

External links
/ IMDb list of Chinese films

1970s
Lists of 1970s films
Films

zh:中国大陆电影